Ekrem Ekinci is Professor of Chemistry. Between 2008 and 2010, he was the rector of Işık University in Istanbul, Turkey.

References

Turkish chemists
Living people
Rectors of universities and colleges in Turkey
Year of birth missing (living people)
Place of birth missing (living people)
21st-century Turkish people